Aye Aye Soe is a Burmese female top  professional bodybuilder. 

She is the first female Burmese bodybuilder to win a gold medal in an international competition at Women's Athletic Physique contest held in Singapore’s NUS center. She won the Miss Fitness Physique 2012 and the 12th Southeast Asia Bodybuilding in 2014.

Biography
Aye Aye Soe was born in Myanmar. She graduated with a chemical engineering degree. At 20, she started her passion in bodybuilding.

Competitive placings
2012	Miss.Fitness Physique	(Winner)
2012	Model Physique	(1st runner-up)
2012	46th Asia Bodybuilding(2nd runner-up)
 2012 46th Model Physique and Fitness Physique  (3rd runner-up) 
2012	4th World Bodybuilding Physique sports Championship (4th runner-up)
2013	Miss.Champion Challenge	(Winner)
2014	12th Southeast Asia Bodybuilding (Winner)
2014	48th Asia Bodybuilding (2nd Runner Up)

References

Burmese female bodybuilders
1990 births
Living people
Professional bodybuilders
People from Yangon